Fábio José de Melo Silva, better known as Padre (Father) Fábio de Melo (April 3, 1971), is a Catholic priest, artist, writer, university professor and presenter. He belonged to the Congregation of the Priests of the Sacred Heart of Jesus. He acts in the Diocese of Taubaté, in the interior of the State of São Paulo. As a singer, he recorded eight albums for the Paulinas-COMEP Catholic record label, one for the record company Canção Nova, an independent project (Tom de Minas). His first record for a secular record company, Vida, was released by LGK Music and by Som Livre, with whom he continues to record, having already released two more albums (Iluminar and Eu e tempo – CD and DVD) by the end of 2009. In all, Fábio de Melo has sold more than 3 million copies of CDs (1.8 million with Som Livre alone), in addition to 3.5 million books. As a university professor, he taught theology at the Dehonian College of Taubaté. Nowadays, he presents the program Spiritual Direction, transmitted by TV Canção Nova every Wednesday at 10 pm, with reruns on Saturdays at 8 pm and at dawn on Monday, at 1 am.

Biography

Father Fábio José de Melo Silva was born in the city of Formiga, Minas Gerais, on April 3, 1971. He became nationally known for his work as a communicator: his work is composed of 6 books published and also 11 CDs that together, sold more than 1.8 million units. A master in theological anthropology, he was ordained in 2001 and works in the diocese of Taubaté, in the interior of São Paulo. He is the youngest of the eight children of the mason Dorinato Bias Silva and the housewife Ana Maria de Melo Silva.

The priesthood

After 18 years of formation and studies in seminaries, with a final phase being frater in the seminary of St. Jude Tadeu of Terra Boa – Pr, on December 15, 2001, in his hometown, in the Mother Church of St. Vincent Ferrer, Fábio de Melo was ordained a priest by the consecratory prayer of the Church and by the imposition of the hands of the Metropolitan Archbishop of Palmas, Tocantins, Bishop Alberto Taveira Corrêa.

Father Mauricio Leão had a great influence on his life as a seminarian, leading him to the Lavras seminary. In his priestly life, he has as reference the priests Zezinho, Joãozinho, and Léo Tarcísio.

Currently he confessed the influence also of the Reverend Caio Fábio.

Father Fábio de Melo graduated from the Abílio Machado State School in Formiga (MG) and the second grade at the Nossa Senhora de Lourdes School in Lavras (MG). He holds a degree in Theology from the Dehonian College of Taubaté, with a diploma from the Pontifical Catholic University of Rio de Janeiro and Philosophy at the Brusque Educational Foundation in Santa Catarina.

He received a post-graduate education in Rio de Janeiro and a master's degree in Belo Horizonte, together with the Jesuits, at Instituto Santo Inácio – ISI (FAJE: Faculdade Jesuíta de Filosofia e Teologia).

Fábio de Melo then returned to Taubaté to teach in the area of Fundamental and Systematic Theology, in the same college where he had graduated.

Poetry and music

With reference to Father Zezinho, SCJ, precursor of the singer priests since the 1960s, Father Fábio de Melo released his first CD, in 1997, entitled "De Deus um cantador".

Then "Saudades do Céu", with the participation of several Catholic artists, bringing together the singers of his congregation, such as Father Zezinho and Father Joãozinho, included in the CD "Sing Heart", a tribute to the Sacred Heart of Jesus.

Upon receiving diaconal ordination, he composes "Seasons of Life," which would become the opening music of his live performances, especially after the release of the DVD Eu e o Tempo. Already ordained priest, in 2003, brings to market his newest work, "Marcas do Eterno".

In 2004, the album "Tom de Minas", with an authorial content, honors an independent project that honors names and places of his home state: Minas Gerais, with the participation of popular singer and songwriter Paulinho Pedra Azul, from the which is a show in the capital, Belo Horizonte, under the name "Minas e Outros Tons".

The return to the themes related to his formation, are part of CD Humano Demais in 2005, that contains songs of his own and of other composers of the catholic music.

In 2006, celebrating his 10 years of acting in Catholic music, he decides to work in addition to some of his compositions, several well-known songs "sertanjeas", in homage to his origins and his father, who also sang and played Viola.

The 2007 CD, Son of Heaven, first out of the Paulines and now for the New Song, tells of personal experiences and of those who have left, such as Father Léo Tarcísio, his trainer, during the seminar and great friend and singer-songwriter Robson Jr., of Cantores de Deus and his best friend, both dead at the same time, victims of cancer. Released the same year, the CD "My Simple People" retakes the idea already tried in "Zé Da Silva", with songs sertanejas, presenting those that were outside the other project.

In 2008 Fábio de Melo released his first CD for the record company Som Livre – "Vida" – a work that made him known nationally, through the various participation in programs on open TV. Continuing his work of evangelization through the media, in 2009 he launched the CD "Iluminar" and shortly after "Eu e o Tempo". In 2014, he recorded "Amar Como Jesus Amou", in a duet with singer Fernanda Takai, on her album Na Medida do Impossível.

Discography

Unreleased albums

Live albums

DVDs

Collecting 

 2000 – Canta Coração (Paulinas-COMEP)
 2007 – Grandes Momentos (Paulinas-COMEP)
 2008 – Coletânea Padre Fabio De Melo (LGK music, Som Livre)
 2009 – Grandes Momentos 2 (Paulinas-COMEP)
 2009 – Grandes Sucessos Vol.1 – Vários Artistas (Paulinas-COMEP)
 2009 – Grandes Sucessos Vol.2 – Vários Artistas (Paulinas-COMEP)
 2010 – Pe. Fábio de Melo – Coletânea Série Ouro – CD em comemoração dos 50 anos da Paulinas-COMEP (Paulinas-COMEP)

Parallel Projects 

 2007 – Brasil (Adriana, Pe. Fábio de Melo, Dunga, Martin Valverde e Migueli) (Solo Sagrado Produções e Eventos).
 2007 – Enredados ao Vivo Vol. 2 – Enredados Brasil (Solo Sagrado Produções e Eventos)
 2007 – DVD Enredados ao Vivo – Enredados Brasil (Solo Sagrado Produções e Eventos)

CD Participations 

 2004

– Diamante Lapidado – Celina Borges (track 6 "Bate Coração")

 2005

– Mais Feliz – Adriana (track 12 – "Nossa Missão")

 2007

– Adriana Ao Vivo – Adriana (track 12 – "Humano Amor de Deus")

 2008

– Perseverar – Adrielle Lopes (track 6 – "Milagre")

 2009

– Tudo Posso – Celina Borges (track 10 – "Lava-me")

– Coração sem abrigo – Andre Leonno (track 11 – "Contrários")

– Milagres – Adriana – (track 03 – "Milagres")

– Typ Vox – Typ Vox (track 10 – "Alma de Adorador")

 2010

– Molda-me – Dalvimar Gallo (track 10 – "Volta pra Casa")

– Tudo Passa Pela Cruz – Olívia Ferreira (track 7 – "Cuidas de Mim")

– 30 Anos Ao vivo – Roupa Nova (track "A Paz")

 2011

– 30 Anos – Paulinho Pedra Azul (track 3 – "Ave Cantadeira")

– Não Estou Sozinho – Banda Dominius & Ivete Sangalo – track 3 – "Não Estou Sozinho"

 2014

– Na Medida do Impossível – Fernanda Takai (track 9 – "Amar Como Jesus Amou")

– Deserto – Iahweh (track 3 – "Deserto")

 2016

– Quem é você? – Celina Borges (track 10 – "O Sol vai brlhar")

DVD participations 

 2007

– Adriana Ao Vivo – Adriana – (track 12 – "Humano Amor de Deus")

 2010

– Raízes ao Vivo – Daniel – (track 11 – "Só o amor")

– Roupa Nova – 30 anos – Roupa Nova – (track 11 – "A Paz")

 2011

Em Santidade – (Ministério Adoração e Vida) – (track 9 – "A esperança chegando")

 2015
Acústico e ao Vivo 2/3 – (Banda Rosa de Saron) – (Casino Boulevard)

Books 

 2006 – Tempo: saudades e esquecimentos – Paulinas-COMEP – .
 2007 – Amigo: somos muitos, mesmo sendo dois – Editora Gente – .
 2008 – Quem Me Roubou de Mim? – Canção Nova – ISBN 97-885-7677098-5.
 2008 – Mulheres de aço e de flores – Gente – ISBN 97-885-7312610-5.
 2008 – Quando o sofrimento bate a sua porta – Canção Nova – ISBN 97-885-7677122-7.
 2009 – Cartas entre Amigos – sobre medos contemporaneos, com Gabriel Chalita – Ediouro – ISBN 97-885-6030302-1.
 2009 – Mulheres Cheias de Graça – Ediouro – .
 2010 – Cartas entre Amigos – sobre ganhar e perder, com Gabriel Chalita – Editora Globo – .
 2011 – O verso e a cena – Editora Globo
 2011 – Tempo de Esperas – Editora Planeta
 2012 – Orfandades – o destino das ausências – Editora Planeta
 2013 – É Sagrado Viver – Editora Planeta
 2014 – O Discípulo da Madrugada – Editora Planeta

Awards 

 2009

– 1st Louvemos o Senhor Trophy

– Best Male Interpreter of 2008

– 2008 Highlights

 2010

– Faustão's Melhores do Ano Trophy

– Best singer

– 2nd Louvemos o Senhor Trophy

– Best Male Interpreter of 2009

– 2009 Highlights

– Best Composer of 2009

– Best 2009 Song for Holy Mass for "Incendeia Minha Alma" – Composers: Rogério and Júlio Cesar

– Best Song of the Year for "Tudo é do Pai" – Composer: Frederico Cruz

2016

– Latin Grammy Award for Best Christian Album (Portuguese Language) (nominated)

2017

– Latin Grammy Award for Best Christian Album (Portuguese Language) (nominated)

References

External links
 http://www.fabiodemelo.com.br

1971 births
Living people
20th-century Brazilian Roman Catholic priests
Brazilian singer-songwriters
Brazilian Roman Catholic singers
Brazilian television presenters
People from Minas Gerais
21st-century Brazilian Roman Catholic priests